The LE postcode area, also known as the Leicester postcode area, is a group of 21 postcode districts in central England, within 12 post towns. These cover most of Leicestershire (including Leicester, Loughborough, Hinckley, Melton Mowbray, Coalville, Market Harborough, Ashby de la Zouch, Lutterworth, Wigston, Markfield and Ibstock) and Rutland (including Oakham), plus small parts of south Nottinghamshire and north Northamptonshire, and very small parts of Derbyshire and Warwickshire.



Coverage
The approximate coverage of the postcode districts:

|-
! LE1
| LEICESTER
| Leicester
| Leicester
|-
! LE2
| LEICESTER
| Oadby, Knighton, Highfields, Aylestone, Eyres Monsell, Glen Parva, Stoughton, Little Stretton
| Leicester, Oadby and Wigston, Harborough, Blaby
|-
! LE3
| LEICESTER
| Braunstone, Glenfield, New Parks, Groby Road (A50), Leicester Forest East, Westcotes
| Leicester, Blaby
|-
! LE4
| LEICESTER
| Beaumont Leys, Belgrave, Birstall, Thurmaston
| Leicester, Charnwood
|-
! LE5
| LEICESTER
| Hamilton, Thurnby Lodge, Evington
| Leicester
|-
! LE6
| LEICESTER
| Ratby, Groby, Newtown Linford 
| Hinckley and Bosworth, Charnwood
|-
! LE7
| LEICESTER
| Scraptoft, Thurnby, Anstey, Billesdon, Gaddesby, Hungarton, Rearsby, Tilton on the Hill, Tugby, Cropston, Thurcaston, Rothley, Barkby, Syston, Wanlip
| Charnwood, Harborough, Melton
|-
! LE8
| LEICESTER
| Blaby, Great Glen, Fleckney, Kibworth, Peatling Magna, Countesthorpe, Whetstone
| Blaby, Harborough
|-
! LE9
| LEICESTER
| Kirby Muxloe, Stoney Stanton, Cosby, Huncote, Croft, Desford, Newbold Verdon, Kirkby Mallory, Earl Shilton, Barwell, Sapcote, Sutton in the Elms, Broughton Astley, Thurlaston, Potters Marston
| Hinckley and Bosworth, Blaby, Harborough
|-
! LE10
| HINCKLEY
| Hinckley, Burbage, Wolvey, Sharnford, Aston Flamville, Copston Magna
| Hinckley and Bosworth, Blaby, Rugby
|-
! LE11
| LOUGHBOROUGH
| Loughborough, Nanpantan
| Charnwood
|-
! LE12
| LOUGHBOROUGH
| East Leake, West Leake, Sutton Bonington, Long Whatton, Mountsorrel, Shepshed, Belton, Quorn, Barrow Upon Soar, Sileby, Wymeswold
| Charnwood, North West Leicestershire, Rushcliffe
|-
! LE13
| MELTON MOWBRAY
| Melton Mowbray
| Melton
|-
! LE14
| MELTON MOWBRAY
| Ashby Folville, Brooksby, Harby, Hickling, Hoby, Ragdale, Rotherby, Scalford, Somerby, Stonesby, Waltham on the Wolds, Wymondham
| Melton, Rushcliffe
|-
! LE15
| OAKHAM
| Oakham, Cold Overton, Empingham, Knossington, Langham, Manton, Owston and Newbold, Thistleton, Uppingham, Whissendine
| Rutland, Melton, Harborough
|-
! LE16
| MARKET HARBOROUGH
| Market Harborough, Arthingworth, Braybrooke, Caldecott, Clipston, East Carlton, East Farndon, East Langton, Great Oxendon, Hallaton, Marston Trussell, Medbourne, Rockingham, Sibbertoft, Stoke Albany
| Harborough, West Northamptonshire, North Northamptonshire, Rutland
|-
! LE17
| LUTTERWORTH
| Lutterworth, Leire, Swinford, Bitteswell, Ullesthorpe, Theddingworth, Gilmorton, Catthorpe, Claybrooke Magna, Wibtoft
| Harborough, Rugby
|-
! LE18
| WIGSTON
| Wigston, South Wigston, Kilby
| Oadby and Wigston, Blaby
|-
! LE19
| LEICESTER
| Narborough, Enderby, Littlethorpe
| Blaby
|-
! style="background:#FFFFFF;"|LE21
| style="background:#FFFFFF;"|LEICESTER
| style="background:#FFFFFF;"|
| style="background:#FFFFFF;"|non-geographic
|-
! style="background:#FFFFFF;"|LE41
| style="background:#FFFFFF;"|LEICESTER
| style="background:#FFFFFF;"|Large user (otherwise in LE4)
| style="background:#FFFFFF;"|non-geographic
|-
! style="background:#FFFFFF;"|LE55
| style="background:#FFFFFF;"|LEICESTER
| style="background:#FFFFFF;"|
| style="background:#FFFFFF;"|non-geographic
|-
! LE65
| ASHBY-DE-LA-ZOUCH
| Ashby-de-la-Zouch, Boundary, Calke, Smisby, Willesley, Worthington
| North West Leicestershire, South Derbyshire
|-
! rowspan="3"| LE67
| COALVILLE
| Coalville
| North West Leicestershire
|-
| IBSTOCK
| Ibstock
| North West Leicestershire
|-
| MARKFIELD
| Markfield
| Hinckley and Bosworth
|-
! style="background:#FFFFFF;"|LE87
| style="background:#FFFFFF;"|LEICESTER
| style="background:#FFFFFF;"|
| style="background:#FFFFFF;"|non-geographic
|-
! style="background:#FFFFFF;"|LE94
| style="background:#FFFFFF;"|LEICESTER
| style="background:#FFFFFF;"|
| style="background:#FFFFFF;"|non-geographic
|-
! style="background:#FFFFFF;"|LE95
| style="background:#FFFFFF;"|LEICESTER
| style="background:#FFFFFF;"|
| style="background:#FFFFFF;"|non-geographic
|}

The LE19 district was formed in 2002 from parts of the LE3 and LE9 districts.

The LE2, LE3 and LE4 postcode districts are all among the top five by population.

Map

See also
Postcode Address File
List of postcode areas in the United Kingdom

References

External links
Royal Mail's Postcode Address File
A quick introduction to Royal Mail's Postcode Address File (PAF)

Leicester
Postcode areas covering the East Midlands